Juan Coronado Gil (born August 25, 1983) is a Dominican basketball player for Caciques de Humacao and the Dominican national team, where he participated at the 2014 FIBA Basketball World Cup.

References

External links
 RealGM profile

1983 births
Living people
Aguacateros de Michoacán players
Basketball players at the 2011 Pan American Games
Bucaneros de La Guaira players
Caciques de Humacao players
Club San Martín de Corrientes basketball players
Dominican Republic expatriate basketball people in Argentina
Dominican Republic expatriate basketball people in Mexico
Dominican Republic expatriate basketball people in Puerto Rico
Dominican Republic expatriate basketball people in Spain
Dominican Republic expatriate basketball people in Venezuela
Dominican Republic men's basketball players
Gimnasia y Esgrima de Comodoro Rivadavia basketball players
Halcones de Xalapa players
Ostioneros de Guaymas (basketball) players
Pan American Games competitors for the Dominican Republic
People from La Vega Province
Piratas de Quebradillas players
Point guards
Shooting guards
2014 FIBA Basketball World Cup players